Ploshchad 1905 Goda is the sixth station of the Yekaterinburg Metro. It was opened on December 22, 1994. It is located between stations «Dinamo» and «Geologicheskaya» and is next to the central square of the city – 1905 Square (Yekaterinburg). There are exits to the streets: 8 Marta and Teatralny lane.

Construction History 
February 1981 — tunneling work continued at the station, construction of surface sites began. 
June 1981 — the demolition of old houses began in the area of the station (streets Uritskovo and Volodarskovo). 
October 1981 — launch of access branches. 
February 1982 — tunnel shaft reinforcement completed. 
June 1983 — tunneling of both tunnels began on the stretch from the station "Dinamo" to the station "Ploshchad 1905 Goda". 
June 1986 — a pedestrian crossing in the area of 8th Marta Street and Teatralny Lane was made in connection with the construction of the southern lobby of the station; the transfer of tram tracks to Moskovskaya Street began. 
November 1986 — construction of station tunnels began after the opening of tram traffic on Moskovskaya street on November 15. 
May 1987 — the development of the pit under station lobby No. 1 began. 
December 1987 — after passing several hundred meters under the city pond, the builders made a connection in the left running tunnel to "Dinamo" station. 
March 1988 — the first tubing is installed in an inclined escalator tunnel. 
April 1988 — N. Chulpanov's complex brigade made a connection in the right underground corridor connecting the stations "Ploshchad 1905 Goda" and "Dinamo", 736 meters are completed including under the city pond. 
June 1989 — the installation of the power traction substation (PTS) is complete. 
December 22, 1994 — the head of the city of Yekaterinburg approves the "act of the state commission on acceptance into operation". The metro is open for passenger traffic toward the station "Prospect Kosmonavtov". 
January 1996 — a crossover is made in tunneling towards the station "Geologicheskaya". 
December 30, 2002 — open for traffic to the station "Geologicheskaya".

Design 
The deep column, three-aisled station was designed by architects of the Sverdlovsk Institute – it was a civil project by Kusenko, Zaslavsky and L. Maslennikov, dedicated to the revolutionary events of 1905. The supports of the vaults are made in the form of granite portals separating the middle hall from the side landing sections of the platform. The color scheme of the interior is contrasting red Karelian granite lined portals and white marble track walls. The lighting fixtures of the central hall are chandeliers and  sconces. Recently (as of February 2011), incandescent light bulbs have been replaced with energy-saving lightbulbs in lighting fixtures, as in the Uralskaya station. On the track walls, there are artistic thematic inserts made in the Florentine mosaic technique by Ural stone carving craftsman.

Future 
In the future, the station "Ploshchad 1905 Goda" (of the first Yekaterinburg metro line) will become a transfer hub to the station "Ploshchad 1905 Goda" of the 2nd planned metro line. In the northern part of the station, it is planned to open a second exit, which will simultaneously become an exit to the city (at the intersection of 8th Marta Street and Lenin Avenue) and a transfer to Line 2.

Ground Public transportation 
The station has exits to multiple stops (including the final ones) of all types of ground transportation: buses, trolleybuses, trams and taxi routes.

 Tables: public transport routes (data as of May 2020)

References

External links 
 «Ploshchad 1905 Goda» stop on the new version of the site «Metro World».

See also 
 «Ulitsa 1905 Goda» Station in Moscow.

Yekaterinburg Metro stations
Railway stations in Russia opened in 1994
Railway stations located underground in Russia